Várzea Grande may refer to one of the following locations in Brazil:
Várzea Grande, Mato Grosso
Várzea Grande, Piauí
Várzea Grande, Pindobaçu

See also
Várzea (disambiguation)